The Blue Lantern Corps is a fictional organization appearing in American comic books published by DC Comics, beginning in 2007 in Green Lantern vol. 4 #25 (December 2007) by Geoff Johns and Ethan Van Sciver. Their powers, similar to those of other organizations based around the emotional spectrum, are fueled by the emotion of hope.

Fictional group history
The Blue Lantern Corps is one of the nine corps empowered by a specific color of the emotional spectrum within the DC Universe. They have begun to fill an increasingly important role within Green Lantern and Green Lantern Corps as major participants within the Blackest Night crossover event. First formed by the banished former-Guardians Ganthet and Sayd, they are based on the planet Odym (later Elpis) and their powers are fueled by the emotion hope.

The Blue Lantern Corps is rooted in the events that transpired during the Sinestro Corps War story line. During the first half of the event, Ganthet and Sayd serve as a dissenting voice among the Guardians as they acknowledge that the Blackest Night prophecy within the Book of Oa is coming to pass. Their willingness to embrace emotions and the love they have for one another leads to the two being banished from Oa. Two issues after their exile, Ganthet reveals the Blackest Night prophecy to the reader, Hal Jordan, Guy Gardner, John Stewart, and Kyle Rayner. In his description he says: "Elsewhere, a flicker of hope will shine from deep space, like a lighthouse warning the ships away from the rocks. The blue light will hold the line in spirit if not in strength". It is revealed at the end of the issue that Ganthet and Sayd have settled on a planet (later named as Odym), have created a blue power ring, and intend to form their own Corps.

Rage of the Red Lanterns
In the Rage of the Red Lanterns plot line, Ganthet and Sayd's Blue Lanterns are finally introduced. The Green Lantern Corps have just been ambushed by the Red Lantern Corps, kidnapping Sinestro from their custody. Hal Jordan, reeling from the effects of an attack from (newly added Red Lantern) Laira, finds himself being healed by the powers of Saint Walker. Saint Walker introduces himself to the Green Lanterns as the Blue Lantern of sector one. By being in his emotional proximity, Jordan's power levels are boosted as long as Walker hopes for his well being. Though Stewart is suspicious of Walker's intentions, Walker's ring creates an illusion based on Stewart's psyche, freeing him from the effects of the Red Lantern attack that caused it. With Stewart placated, Walker takes Jordan to Odym. There, the reader is introduced to the second member of the Blue Lantern Corps, as Walker and Jordan watch Warth being given a blue power ring by Ganthet and Sayd. After which the two former-Guardians ask Jordan to aid the Blue Lanterns in rescuing Sinestro from Atrocitus, as his survival is important in the upcoming War of Light.

Jordan reluctantly accepts Ganthet's request and goes with the Blue Lanterns to the Red Lantern home planet of Ysmault. Along the way, Walker tells Jordan that the Green Lanterns are nothing but a police force, and that Jordan would lead the Blue Lanterns like no other. Though Jordan tells him he has no intention of leaving his Corps, the reader observes Walker telling Warth that it was imperative that Jordan become a Blue Lantern. On Ysmault, Jordan locates Sinestro but is promptly ambushed by the Red Lanterns. He's captured by Atrocitus' forces, and though Atrocitus tells Laira that Jordan's flesh and blood belong to her, her attack is interrupted by the arrival of the Sinestro Corps. Chaos ensues, during which Walker and Warth come to Jordan's aid. They are shown not only boosting Jordan's power, but also capably handling the two battling Corps. Warth easily keeps the two from fighting one another, while Walker keeps Atrocitus himself at bay (though admittedly is unable to douse his red fire). During the conflict, Jordan seems to be able to appeal to Laira's true self despite the red power ring's control on her. Any true reversion of its effects are halted as Sinestro kills her. Outraged, Jordan attacks Sinestro and is so overcome with rage that Laira's red power ring chooses him as its new host. Atrocitus welcomes him to the Red Lantern Corps.

Despite Walker's claim that the power of the blue light is the greatest in the spectrum, Atrocitus reveals the weakness behind the Blue Lanterns: hope is nothing without willpower to enact it. Walker concedes that with Jordan's green power ring inactive and no other green aura influencing them, he and Warth are reduced to the basic abilities of flight and aura projection. Despite his disadvantage, Walker holds true to his earlier assertion that Jordan would join his Corps as he places his own ring on Jordan's hand. The red power ring is destroyed, and Jordan is released from its influence. Feeling their powers drained by the coalescing blue energy, the Sinestro Corps flee. Surging with blue and green power, the outpouring of energy from both of Jordan's rings defeats the Red Lantern Corps. In the aftermath of the conflict, the reader is able to observe Scar remarking on the forces gathering for the upcoming war, during which Atrocitus is shown performing a ritual to discern the location of the Blue Lantern Corps' home planet. In the same collection of scenes, Ganthet and Sayd are shown talking with the third Blue Lantern, Hynn.

Agent Orange
After the conclusion of Rage of the Red Lanterns, the Blue Lanterns and Jordan return to Odym. Jordan is unable to remove the blue power ring and finds that it was interfering with the use of his green power ring. Ganthet explains to Walker that they did say Jordan would lead the Blue Lanterns, but not as a Blue Lantern himself. As a Green Lantern, Jordan's will would have been capable of charging the entire Blue Lantern Corps. Sayd says that a new blue power ring will need to be made for Walker, as they are unable to remove his original one from Jordan. Ganthet tells Jordan that, in order to remove the ring, he must use it by finding something to hope for. Jordan leaves for Oa, and Ganthet tells Walker and Warth that they must continue to recruit others to their Corps. The Blue Lanterns have a new mission: to locate those who wield the indigo light, for hope and compassion must work together. On Oa, the Guardians find that they are unable to remove the blue power ring from Jordan as well. Distracted from the blue power ring by terrorist demands from Agent Orange, the Guardians launch an assault on Okaara in the Vega system. Jordan's blue power ring continues to cause problems as the Green Lanterns come to conflict with Larfleeze's Orange Lantern constructs. Becoming separated from the group however, Jordan's blue ring does attract Larfleeze's attention. Larfleeze lusts after the blue ring, but finds that his constructs are not immune to the blue light as they are from the green. The blue power ring refuses to be stolen by Larfleeze, claiming that hope is selfless. Larfleeze attempts to remove it by force, by severing Jordan's hand with an axe made from orange light. Though it is not initially clear to the reader, Larfleeze fails again. Sensing his hope of being relieved from the constant hunger he feels, the blue ring creates an illusion which fools him into believing he succeeded in stealing it; Jordan's hand is, in fact, intact, and the Blue ring is still on his finger. Jordan returns to battle Larfleeze with the Green Lantern Corps. During the battle, Jordan's blue power ring continues to repeatedly ask him what he hopes for. In frustration, Jordan says that he hopes that once the battle with Agent Orange is over that it will stop asking him what he hopes for. The blue ring registers this as a sincere hope, recharges all of the Green Lantern Corps' power rings, and allows Jordan to subdue Larfleeze. After Jordan gains control of his ring, it removes itself from him and leaves to find a new recipient in Sector 2828.

The Guardians realize that if they take the orange power battery from Larfleeze, someone else would inevitably find it, becoming a new Agent Orange. Preferring to know where Agent Orange is, they decide to negotiate with Larfleeze once more. The details of the negotiation are not fully revealed to the reader, however it is shown that Larfleeze asked the Guardians where he could find a blue power ring. On Odym, Ganthet, Sayd, and the Blue Lanterns are shown walking on a beach and talking with their newest member: Sister Sercy. The issue ends with Larfleeze launching an attack on the Blue Lantern Corps.

Blackest Night

During the Blue Lanterns' struggle against Larfleeze, a number of black power rings come to Odym. Unable to detect any dead bodies on the planet's surface to attach themselves to, the rings hover in the sky, waiting for a death to occur. Hal Jordan, Sinestro, Carol Ferris, and Indigo-1 arrive on Odym during the conflict between the Blue and Orange Lanterns in order to recruit Saint Walker to help form a white light composed of the seven lights of the emotional spectrum that will defeat the Black Lantern Corps. Under the influence of Jordan's green power ring, the Blue Lanterns' rings are charged by Jordan's willpower and capable of combating Larfleeze's constructs. The constructs suddenly disappear as Larfleeze finds himself being attacked by the reanimated corpses of his Orange Lanterns, now members of the Black Lantern Corps. Saint Walker, Ganthet, and Sayd join the team Jordan and Indigo-1 have assembled, and accompany them to recruit Larfleeze and Atrocitus. Despite saving him from the Black Lanterns, Larfleeze is resistant to join the group due to the nature of his power and an interest in obtaining his own Guardian. In order to secure his participation, Sayd offers him her servitude in return for his compliance. Atrocitus is also unwilling to assist the team, attacking Jordan and Sinestro in his rage. To calm Atrocitus, Saint Walker shows him an illusion where he and a female of his species are happily being invited to the Blue Lantern Corps. When the illusion proves insufficient, Saint Walker convinces the Red Lantern to join them by relating the story of how his family died in an effort to save his world.

While on Earth battling the Black Lanterns, Saint Walker's ring was activated by Ganthet to deputize Barry Allen the Flash as a Blue Lantern. Barry Allen under Saint Walker's tutelage rescued Bart Allen from being a Black Lantern. The rest of the Blue Lantern Corps worked with the Green Lantern Corps to destroy the millions of Black Lanterns coming from the Black Lantern-recreated planet of Xanshi.

Brightest Day

War of the Green Lanterns

When Saint Walker was trapped in the Book of the Black by Lyssa Drak, Hal passed his ring on to Kyle Rayner so that Kyle could use it to fight off the Green Lanterns under Krona and Parallax's influence. Although Kyle was able to master the blue ring to use its power to at least temporarily cure some of the Green Lanterns pursuing them from Krona's influence, he was unable to cure Mogo before John Stewart was forced to destroy it, although Kyle was later able to use the blue ring to purge Guy Gardner of the side-effects of his use of a Red Lantern ring. With Guy cured, Kyle returned to his green ring, Walker reclaiming his blue ring after Krona's defeat. He later assisted Ganthet by treating his injured hand before he was forced to depart from Oa.

New 52 – The Fall of the Blue Lantern Corps
In September 2011, The New 52 rebooted DC's continuity. In this new timeline, when Kyle Rayner becomes a 'magnet' for other power rings, Saint Walker is the only member of the other five Corps who shows up to help him rather than demanding his ring back, helping Kyle escape the others' attacks and travel to Oa to try and seek the aid of the Guardians. Unfortunately, this plan backfires when it is revealed that Ganthet has been stripped of his emotions by the other Guardians, to the extent that he attacks Walker when Walker tries to help Kyle directly after he is briefly overwhelmed by the rings, Ganthet proclaiming that the Blue Lantern Corps were a mistake that he will now rectify. Saint Walker has since joined the New Guardians in investigating the Orrery that has appeared in the Vega system, even forming the beginnings of a tentative friendship with Sinestro Corps member Arkillo after he healed Arkillo's tongue. After Saint Walker returns to Odym, the Blue Lanterns are attacked by the Reach, enemies of the Lantern Corps, prompting Walker to send a desperate message for help to Kyle Rayner and the other New Guardians, while teaching other Blue Lanterns how to draw on their aura to enhance their defensive powers and fight back without a Green Lantern's presence.

As Kyle finally arrives at Odym, he sees the planet swarming with Reach ships. He is quickly joined by Fatality, Arkillo and the Weaponer as Saint Walker and the Blue Lanterns are still trying to defend the Central Power Battery. Yet even with the arrival of the reinforcements, the Reach gets the upper hand overall. The Lanterns are able to take out individual soldiers; however, Fatality’s crystal shield soon begins to shatter after a few moments, Arkillo’s ring begins to malfunction also, as per the Weaponer’s foreshadowing and even Kyle’s arrival, powering both him and the Blue Lantern's up cannot hold the invasion much time. Without any other solution, Kyle is able to convince Saint Walker and the Blue Lanterns to retreat from Odym, surrendering the Blue Central Power Battery and Odym itself to the Reach.

After the Wrath of the First Lantern, it is revealed that the Blue Lantern Corps have found the new planet, Elpis, to settle on. However, the new planet is soon targeted by the cosmic entity known as Relic who began a quest to rid the universe of its ostensible "lightsmiths", as he considers it the only way to keep the universe safe. Kyle Rayner, Carol Ferris and the Templar Guardians arrived to help the Blue Lanterns, yet they couldn't prevent Relic from draining the Blue Central Battery of its power, rendering all blue lanterns rings powerless. Kyle, Carol and the Guardians managed to flee from the planet with an unconscious Saint Walker, while the rest of the Blue Lantern Corps members were all killed by Relic who then left the now devastated planet in search for his next target.

Saint Walker is next seen recovering on Mogo (the new base of operations for the Green Lantern Corps, following the destruction of Oa) under the care of Lantern Soranik Natu.  When he awakens he is informed by Hal of the events of Relics assault on the Source Wall and the death of Kyle Rayner.  Walker is devastated to learn that Elpis and the rest of the Blue Lanterns were destroyed by Relic.  He is so despondent that his ring abandons him for losing hope.  Walker states that this is probably for the best since the blue rings are the most powerful and their continued use would accelerate the depletion of the emotional reservoir.

He later regained his hope, and his ring, after witnessing Kyle Rayner's White Lantern abilities on New Genesis, confident that the emotional reservoir could be refilled, which it was after all the entities sacrificed themselves to replenish the well.

With the disappearance of the Green Lantern Corps, Saint Walker as the last Blue Lantern is kidnapped by Lobo on orders of Sinestro. Sinestro convinces Saint Walker to help him and subjects him to experiments from his science division, so he can now supercharge Sinestro Corps rings. Walker helps the Sinestro Corps save the Earth and the galaxy from The Paling. Sinestro gives leadership of this corps over to his daughter former Green Lantern Soranik Natu, who makes Arkillo partnered with Saint Walker as lanterns assigned to Earth sector.

Some time later, the Blue Corps appears to have settled once again on Odym, but the magically infused rogue guardian Koyos combines the energies of magic, the emotional spectrum and anti-chaos and targeted Zamaron, Maltus, the Helix (base of the Controllers) and Odym itself in order to destroy permanently the Guardians of the Universe and cleanse the Universe from everything of the Maltusian line.

Prominent members

Leadership
 Ganthet and Sayd: While both Guardians started the Blue Lantern Corps, they are no longer Guardians to the blue light of hope after the Blackest Night event, with Ganthet becoming a Green Lantern and Sayd becoming the Guardian of the orange light of avarice.
 Saint Walker (of Sector 1): A saint from the planet Astonia who becomes the recipient of the first blue power ring after he aids his people in finding hope despite their sun's approaching death. He aids Hal Jordan and the other Green Lanterns after they are ambushed by Atrocitus and his Red Lantern Corps. Walker gives his original blue power ring to Jordan in order to heal him from the effects of being bonded with a red power ring.  He loses his hope, and therefore his ring, after learning of the death of the rest of the corps during Relic's siege of Elpis. He later regained his hope, and his ring, after witnessing Kyle Rayner's White Lantern abilities on New Genesis, confident that the emotional reservoir could be refilled.

Ring Bearers
 Brother Warth (of Sector 2): An elephant-like alien who bears a strong resemblance to the Hindu god Ganesha that is recruited by Saint Walker. In the same way, he will recruit the next member of the corps and so on.
 Brother Hynn (of Sector 3): Shown in the midst of his selection process with Ganthet and Sayd at the end of the Rage of the Red Lanterns arc. His name is revealed in promotional imagery for Blackest Night. (deceased)
 Sister Sercy (of Sector 4): A religious figure from a planet long oppressed by Evil Star (another old Green Lantern foe) who was presumably recruited by Hynn. She is officially shown as having joined the Blue Lanterns just before Larfleeze's arrival on Odym. Her name is revealed in promotional imagery for Blackest Night. (deceased)
 Brother Shon (of Sector 11): The first new Blue Lantern to be named since DC's New 52 revamp, Shon was introduced in The New Guardians as an alien force called The Reach invades Odym. During the battle that ensues, Shon loses all hope for the Blue Lantern Corps winning, and his blue power ring abandons him, stating that a replacement from Sector 11 must be found. (deceased)

Former members
 Barry Allen (of Sector 2814): One of the renowned speedsters using the name of The Flash. Forensic scientist Barry Allen is chosen to become a deputy Blue Lantern during the war against the Black Lantern Corps. Barry is later discharged from the Corps following his final battle.
 Hal Jordan (of Sector 2814): A Green Lantern officer given a blue power ring by Saint Walker as a way of freeing him from the possession of a red power ring. Neither Jordan nor the Guardians (including Ganthet and Sayd) are able to remove the blue power ring without Jordan uncovering his greatest hope. It is later revealed that Ganthet and Sayd planned to combat The Blackest Night by having Jordan lead the Blue Lantern Corps (empowering them with his great willpower). The blue ring later left Jordan to find a suitable bearer after the Green Lantern Corps' battle with Agent Orange.
 Nicole Morrison (of Sector 2814): The host of Adara, the embodiment of hope, she has access to all the abilities of a Blue Lantern, although she did not appear to need to be near a Green Lantern to access her powers like the others. She was discharged from the Corps following the capture of Adara.
 Krona (of Sector 0): During the War of the Green Lanterns story line, Krona temporarily becomes a member of the Blue Lantern Corps when he puts on Saint Walker's power ring. After he's killed the power ring returns to Saint Walker.
 Kyle Rayner (of Sector 2814): When the rogue Guardian known as Krona launched his attack on Oa and restored Parallax into the Green Central Power Battery, Kyle is forced to remove his green power ring to avoid being contaminated by the yellow impurity. Later Hal Jordan gives him the choice of another power ring so they could fight back against Krona and Kyle chose the blue power ring of Saint Walker. However, since the ring did not choose its bearer, Kyle could not control the ring properly. Since the blue rings have very few abilities without an active green ring nearby there was very little that Kyle could do. Unfortunately, blue rings also supercharge green ones and since the only Green Lanterns nearby were under Krona's control Kyle only succeeded in supercharging their opponents.
 Guy Gardner (Of sector 2814): 5 years in the future, Gardner is shown to have joined the Blue Lantern Corps after trying every other Corps, deeming the servants of Hope to be the strongest. The ranks of the Red Lanterns having grown to monstrous numbers, and with no Blood Lake to restore their sanity, Gardner partnered with Red Lantern Bleez to purge the Red Lantern Corps members of their rage and powers. With the end of the new 52, this outcome is no longer certain...

Oath
Just as the Green Lanterns and other Lantern Corps recharge their own rings, the following is the oath used by Blue Lanterns to recharge their blue power rings:

Entity
 is the embodiment of hope, is connected to the blue light of the Emotional Spectrum, and is bird-like in appearance. It is first shown during the Blackest Night event in Green Lantern vol. 4 #52 as Sinestro, recently transformed into a White Lantern, recounts the creation of the emotional entities. Adara was created from the first act of prayer from a sentient being caught in a fierce storm. Like the other emotional entities, Adara was attracted to Earth by the (White) Entity and it is now being hunted by Krona. An artist error shows the Sinestro Corps symbol on Atrocitus' divining ritual map. However, since Parallax had already been captured, this was more than likely supposed to be Adara. According to Atrocitus' divining ritual, Adara can be found in the northeastern United States. Adara eventually chooses for its host a 14-year-old girl from Livonia, Michigan, named Nicole Morrison. Nicole had been kidnapped and after being possessed by Adara, confronted her abductor and forgave him.

Later, Saint Walker brings Hal Jordan and Larfleeze to Nicole's location. Still possessed by the hope entity, Nicole appears to retain her sense of self, stating she is able to hear the hope in her parents' hearts as well as the crowd around them. Nicole goes on to say she can sense an emptiness in Larfleeze and tells him that his parents are still alive and they miss him. She also tells Jordan that he is afraid to hope and asks him why. Before Hal can answer, the group is interrupted by the arrival of Barry Allen.

After Flash and Jordan discuss Jordan's recent actions, the Indigo Tribe appears with Proselyte, who has chosen a host, and Black Hand, who appears to be brain-washed. Nicole confirms this, saying she senses no hope inside them. Tension grows about whose side the Indigo Tribe is really on. This is cut short when the mysterious figure appears again and releases Parallax, who possesses the Flash.

A battle then erupts between Jordan and the Parallax-possessed Flash. While this is happening, Nicole, Saint Walker, Larfleeze, and Shane Thompson try to defeat the figure. This fails when the figure rips Parallax, Proselyte, and Adara from their hosts.

Adara was later seen with Krona on Oa where it possessed one of the remaining six Guardians of the Universe. Adara was eventually free from Krona's control when the rogue Guardian was killed by Hal Jordan.

Adara took refugee on the Blue Central Power Battery, and only left the battery when the cosmic entity known as Relic targeted the new home planet of the Blue Lanterns. As Adara fled it was revealed that the entity was also suffering from a strange illness like all the rest of the emotional entities.

The strange illness is revealed by Relic to be the reservoir of the emotional energy that's becoming exhausted which in turn will end the universe. Adara joined the Entity, Ophidian, Ion, Proselyte and the Predator into seek out Kyle Rayner, whom they believe can locate both Relic and the reservoir in order to save the universe, even if it means sacrificing themselves. The entities take Kyle Rayner's body and flee to Ysmault where they free the Butcher from Atrocitus. The only Entity who remained unaware of their plans is Parallax, who was currently being controlled by Sinestro during the Forever Evil story arc (which was running concurrently with Lights Out).

Eventually, Relic identifies the reservoir of the emotional spectrum as being inside the Source Wall, and heads there along with his captured light from the destroyed Corps and Batteries. Kyle manages to overcome the influence of the various entities, subduing them inside his body but not driving them out. He and the Templar Guardians find Relic at the Source Wall, and come to the same conclusion that the light used profusely was a finite resource; the only question was how to replenish it. Relic seeks to experiment on the entities inside of Kyle, with the intention of using them to replenish the source, but is stopped by a contingency of Green, Red and Indigo Lanterns, who mean to stop Relic from going any further. Hal Jordan, John Stewart, Guy Gardner, who is now a Red Lantern, and Kyle Rayner execute a plan to drive Relic into the Source Wall where he will be trapped forever. Kyle pushes them away and breaks through the Source Wall, which had become significantly weaker with the draining of the light source, and releases the entities inside of him, who sacrifice themselves to replenish the light source and defeat Relic.

Powers and abilities

All Blue Lanterns are armed with a blue power ring, fueled by the emotion of hope. While hope is the most powerful of the seven emotions, Blue Lanterns must be near an active Green Lantern's power ring to tap into their own rings' full power. Otherwise, the rings are only capable of the default abilities of flight and a protective aura. This is because the power of hope is nothing without the willpower to enact it. The Blue Lantern's protective aura allows them to survive in space and other hostile environments and can be manipulated to a limited degree even without a Green Lantern present, using it to augment their strength and extending it to form a larger shield, but this ability is almost exclusively defensive. Blue rings must be activated by true hope before they will operate at their user's command.

While under the influence of a nearby green power ring, a blue power ring has the same abilities as a green ring, plus some unique powers of its own. Blue Lanterns can heal wounds and regenerate lost body parts. The ring's power can be supplemented with the hope of other living beings; for instance, Saint Walker and Warth were able to reduce a dying sun's age by 8.6 billion years because of the hope emanating from the inhabitants of a nearby planet. A blue ring can negatively impact the performance of rings on the opposite side of the emotional spectrum. It can neutralize the corruptive effects of red power rings, block the energy-stealing properties of orange rings (as well as nullify its side effects on the bearer of it), and drain the power of yellow power rings. While at first it appeared that a blue ring could only charge a green power ring to twice its maximum power level which could also negatively impact a green ring, as close proximity to the Blue Central Power Battery would overcharge the ring, causing it to implode (taking the user's hand with it), it had been revealed that a blue ring can in fact charge any power ring as long as the users of the blue light wish to. Blue power rings manifest their constructs mainly by reading the target's hopes, but can make wielder-directed constructs like the other corps.

Other versions

The Lightsmiths
In the universe prior to the current one, groups managed to tap into the wellspring of power created by the Emotional Spectrum. In this universe those who tapped into the blue light were known as the Lightsmiths of the Blue Light of Faith.

Star Trek/Green Lantern: The Spectrum War
In a possible future, when Nekron launches a new assault on the universe, rapidly recruiting the dead as his agents against the living as his forces claim even more lives, Ganthet triggers a 'last light' protocol that uses the last of his energy to send himself, the rings of six of the seven Corps (Minus a Green Lantern ring) and the last surviving members of the seven Corps to another universe to try and escape Nekron's assault, the various ring-wielders and the rings arriving in the new Star Trek universe. Although the Blue, Violet and Indigo rings find wielders in Pavel Chekov, Nyota Uhura and Leonard McCoy, the Yellow, Red, and Orange rings choose Klingon general Chang, a Gorn leader and a Romulan councillor as their wielders. After the Enterprise crew meet Hal, they rescue Carol and an injured Saint Walker, with McCoy using his Indigo ring to examine Walker's injuries. Although he confirms that Walker will recover, Carol reveals that Nekron was drawn into this new universe along with the rings, Nekron 'manifesting' at the site of Vulcan's destruction. Walker revives in time to assist in the final fight with Nekron, subsequently remaining with the Enterprise as it continues its mission.

In other media

Television
The Blue Lantern Corps appear in Green Lantern: The Animated Series. This version of the group is founded by Ganthet, with Saint Walker and Brother Warth as its first members. In the series finale "Dark Matter", series original character and former Red Lantern, Razer, sets out to find Aya, who had sacrificed herself to save the universe, with his conviction that she is still alive drawing a blue power ring to him. Before the series was cancelled, Razer was planned to appear in the second season as a Blue Lantern.

Video games
 The Blue Lantern Corps appear in DC Universe Online.
 Saint Walker appears as a playable character in Lego Batman 3: Beyond Gotham.
 Saint Walker appears as a playable character in DC Legends.

Toys
 Saint Walker was featured in the Blackest Night series of the DC Comics Superhero Collection.
 A six-inch figure of Saint Walker was included in the Blackest Night toyline.
 A six-inch figure of Brother Warth was included in the Green Lantern series of action figures by DC Direct.

References

External links
 

DC Comics aliens
DC Comics extraterrestrial superheroes
DC Comics superhero teams
DC Comics law enforcement agencies
Green Lantern characters
Characters created by Geoff Johns
Fiction set around Polaris
Fictional pacifists